Alessandro Iacono (born October 29, 1973) is an Italian former professional footballer who made 61 appearances in the Italian professional leagues. In international football, he represented Italy at under-18 level.

References

1973 births
Living people
Italian footballers
Association football midfielders
A.C. Legnano players
U.S. Triestina Calcio 1918 players
U.S. Pergolettese 1932 players
Santarcangelo Calcio players
A.S.D. Victor San Marino players
Forlì F.C. players
U.S. Russi players